Daina Šveica (née Mallenberga, born 28 July 1939) also known as Daina Schweiz is a retired Latvian rower who was most successful in the double sculls. In this event she won five European medals between 1963 and 1967, three gold medals with Maija Kaufmane (1963–1965) and one gold and one bronze with Tatyana Gomolko. Šveica was a member of the International Rowing Federation.

References

1939 births
Living people
Latvian female rowers
Soviet female rowers
European Rowing Championships medalists